Philip Alan Garrant (born  1969) is a United States Space Force lieutenant general who serves as the deputy chief of space operations for strategy, plans, programs, and requirements.

Early life and education 
Philip Alan Garrant is the son of Richard and Martha Garrant of Hanover, Maryland. His father is a United States Army officer and his mother is a school teacher. He has a brother who is a reservist in the United States Navy while working for the United States Department of Defense. He finished high school in 1987 at Meade Senior High School.

Garrant received a B.S. in electrical engineering in 1991 from the Johns Hopkins University. He later earned M.S. degrees in systems management and systems engineering from Capitol College and Air Force Institute of Technology, respectively. He also attended the Air War College, Army War College, University of North Carolina, and Center for Creative Leadership.

Military career 

Garrant commissioned into the United States Air Force on May 23, 1991, through an Air Force Reserve Officer Training Corps program at the University of Maryland.

Garrant was nominated for promotion to major general in May 2020, and he was promoted on August 14, 2020. In April 2021, he was nominated for transfer into the United States Space Force. He transferred to the new service in June 2021.

In June 2022, Garrant was nominated for promotion to lieutenant general and appointment as the deputy chief of space operations for strategy, plans, programs, and requirements of the U.S. Space Force.

Assignments 

1. March 1992 — June 1995, Systems Engineer then Program Manager, Document and Data Networks Division, National Security Agency, Fort George G. Meade, Md.
2. June 1995 — June 1999, Systems Engineer then Program Manager, Data Masked
3. June 1999 — March 2001, Air Combat Training Manager, Weapons and Tactics Branch, Headquarters U.S. Air Forces in Europe, Ramstein Air Base, Germany
4. March 2001 — June 2002, Executive Officer, Director of Air and Space Operations, Headquarters USAFE, Ramstein AB, Germany
5. August 2002 — August 2003, Program Manager, F-16 Structures Branch, Ogden Air Logistics Center, Hill AFB, Utah
6. August 2003 — September 2004, Student, Intermediate Developmental Education, Systems Engineering Department, Air Force Institute of Technology,
Wright-Patterson AFB, Ohio
7. September 2004 — July 2006; Chief, Advanced Sensors Branch; Assistant Secretary of the Air Force for Acquisition, Rosslyn, Va.
8. July 2006 — June 2007; Chief, Predator, Reaper, and Big Safari Programs Branch; Assistant Secretary of the Air Force for Acquisition, Rosslyn, Va.
9. June 2007 — June 2009, Commander, 689 Armament Systems Squadron, Air Armament Center, Eglin AFB, Fla.
10. July 2008 — January 2009; Multi-National Corps-Iraq, C-8 Acquisition Liaison Officer, Camp Victory, Iraq
11. June 2009 — June 2010; Deputy Director, 808 Armament Systems Group, Air Armament Center, Eglin AFB Fla.
12. July 2010 — June 2011, Student, Senior Developmental Education, Army War College, Carlisle Barracks, Pa.
13. July 2011 — May 2014, Senior Material Leader, Evolved Expendable Launch Vehicle Systems Division, Space and Missile Systems Center, Los Angeles AFB, Calif.
14. October 2013 — April 2014; Deputy Director for Regional Teams, Operational Contract Support and Chief, Audit Readiness; Headquarters U.S. Forces-Afghanistan, Kabul, Afghanistan and Al Udeid, Qatar
15. May 2014 — June 2017, Director, Space Superiority Systems Directorate, Space and Missile Systems Center, Los Angeles AFB, Calif.
16. June 2017 — June 2019, Vice Commander and Deputy Air Force Program Executive Officer for Space, Space and Missile Systems Center, Los Angeles AFB, Calif.
17. June 2019 — present, Program Executive for Ground-based Weapon Systems, Missile Defense Agency, Redstone Arsenal, Ala.

Personal life 
His wife, Heather, is a local school nurse. He has four children, three sons and a daughter, two of whom work for the Air Force as civilians.

Awards and decorations 
Garrant is the recipient of the following awards:

Dates of promotion

Writings

References 

 

Living people
Year of birth missing (living people)
Place of birth missing (living people)
United States Air Force generals
United States Space Force generals